The qualifying play-off of the 2013 AFC Champions League was played on 9 and 13 February 2013, to decide three of the 32 places in the group stage.

Draw
The draw for the qualifying play-off was held on 6 December 2012, 16:00 UTC+8, at the AFC House in Kuala Lumpur, Malaysia.

The following six teams (four from West Zone, two from East Zone) were entered into the qualifying play-off draw:

West Zone
 Saba Qom
 Al-Nasr
 Al-Shabab Al-Arabi
 Lokomotiv Tashkent

East Zone
 Brisbane Roar
 Buriram United

Format
Each tie was played as a single match, with extra time and penalty shoot-out used to decide the winner if necessary. The winners of each tie advanced to the group stage to join the 29 automatic qualifiers.

Matches

|-
|+West Zone

|+East Zone

|}

Notes

West Zone

East Zone

References

External links

1